João Pedro Morais (6 March 1935 – 27 April 2010) was a Portuguese footballer. He started playing as a winger, and later became a fullback.

Club career
Born in Cascais, Morais joined Sporting CP in 1958, arriving from S.C.U. Torreense where he had made his Primeira Liga debut. He spent the following 11 seasons with the Lisbon club, appearing in 256 matches all competitions comprised – including friendlies – and scoring 68 goals.

Morais was essential as Sporting won the 1964 edition of the UEFA Cup Winners' Cup: in the final's replay (3–3 in the first match), he scored from a direct corner kick in a 1–0 win against MTK Budapest FC.

Morais left the Lions in June 1969, having won four major titles. He retired at the age of 38, after three years in amateur football with Rio Ave F.C. and F.C. Paços de Ferreira.

International career
Morais earned nine caps for Portugal, over one year. His debut was on 18 June 1966 in a 1–0 friendly victory over Scotland, in Glasgow.

Morais was selected for the country's 1966 FIFA World Cup squad, appearing in all three group stage games in an eventual third-place finish. In the match against Brazil, he committed one of the most infamous World Cup fouls on Brazilian legend Pelé; However, he was allowed to stay on the field by referee George McCabe without being booked.

Later life and death
Morais settled in Vila do Conde – the city of his penultimate club – after retiring, going on to work as a city hall employee. He died on 27 April 2010 at 75, after a long battle with illness.

Honours

Club
Sporting
Primeira Liga: 1961–62, 1965–66
Taça de Portugal: 1962–63
UEFA Cup Winners' Cup: 1963–64

International
Portugal
FIFA World Cup third place: 1966

References

External links

1935 births
2010 deaths
Sportspeople from Cascais
Portuguese footballers
Association football defenders
Association football wingers
Association football utility players
Primeira Liga players
Caldas S.C. players
S.C.U. Torreense players
Sporting CP footballers
Rio Ave F.C. players
F.C. Paços de Ferreira players
Portugal international footballers
1966 FIFA World Cup players